Joe Palooka in the Big Fight is a 1949 comedy film directed by Cy Endfield, based on the comic strip by Ham Fisher. It is an entry in Monogram's  Joe Palooka series.

Plot
Joe is framed by gamblers who hope to fix the outcome of an upcoming boxing match. When Joe manages to clear his name, the gamblers frame the scrupulously honest boxer with murder. On the run from the law, Joe is forced to turn gumshoe and solve the murder himself—and he'd better hurry if he's going to get to the Big Fight on time.

Cast
Leon Errol as Knobby
Joe Kirkwood, Jr. as Joe Palooka
David Bruce as Tom Conway
Lina Romay as Maxine Harlan
George O'Hanlon as Louie
Virginia Welles as Anne Howe
Greg McClure as Grady
Taylor Holmes as Dr. Benson
Ian Macdonald as Mike
Lou Lubin as Talmadge
Bert Conway as Pee Wee
Lyle Talbot as Lt. Muldoon
Benny Baker as Fight Secretary
Eddie Gribbon as Canvas
Jack Roper as Scranton
Frances Osborne as Wardrobe Woman
Harry Hayden as Commissioner L.R. Harris
Frank Fenton as Detective Williams
George Fisher as Contest Announcer
Ned Glass as Frank T. Macy, Fight Manager
Dick Elliott as Fight Promoter
John Indrisano as First Referee
Harry Tyler as Romero's Manager
Paul Maxey as Mr. Howe
Dewey Robinson as Detective Burns

Critical reception
TV Guide noted a "better-than-average "Joe Palooka" film...Making the most of realistic dialog, director Cyril Endfield moves the film along at a nice pace while holding together a number of plot lines. Surprisingly, there isn't much boxing footage in this one.

References

External links
Joe Palooka in the Big Fight at IMDb

1940s sports comedy films
1949 films
American boxing films
American black-and-white films
Films based on American comics
Films directed by Cy Endfield
American sports comedy films
1949 comedy films
1940s English-language films
1940s American films
Joe Palooka films